Magadi is a town in the Indian state of Karnataka.

Magadi may also refer to:

 Magadi, Kenya, a town in Kenya
 Lake Magadi, a lake in Kenya
 Magadi Soda Company, Kenya
 Magadi (crater), a crater on Mars